Pruszcz is a town in Świecie County, Kuyavian-Pomeranian Voivodeship, in north-central Poland. It is the seat of the gmina (administrative district) called Gmina Pruszcz.

The town has a population of 2,300.

References

Cities and towns in Kuyavian-Pomeranian Voivodeship
Świecie County